Media Life Magazine was an online publication that was started in May 1999 by Gene Ely. The publication covered all aspects of the media. The magazine ceased publication in late March 2017.

References

External links
 

Defunct magazines published in the United States
Magazines about the media
Magazines established in 1999
Magazines disestablished in 2017
Magazines published in New York City
Online magazines published in the United States
1999 establishments in New York (state)